Willie McGee may refer to:

 Willie McGee (born 1958), is an American retired baseball player
 Willie McGee (American football) (born 1950), former American football player
 Willie McGee (convict) (died 1951), African American who was controversially sentenced to death in 1945 for rape
 Willie McGee (Gaelic footballer) (born 1947), Irish Gaelic footballer
 Willie Magee (cyclist), British Olympic cyclist

See also
 William McGee (disambiguation)